St. Joseph may refer to:
Port St. Joe, Florida, the county seat of Gulf County
St. Joseph, Gulf County, Florida, a former town near Port St. Joe
St. Joseph, Pasco County, Florida, an unincorporated community
St. Joseph, Seminole County, Florida, a former unincorporated community

See also 
St. Joseph's Plantation (Flagler County, Florida)